This page is a timeline documenting events of Jazz in the year 1983.

Events

March
 25 – The 10th Vossajazz started in Voss, Norway (March 25 – 27).

May
 18 – 11th Nattjazz started in Bergen, Norway (May 18 – June 1).
 20 – 12th Moers Festival started in Moers, Germany (May 20 – 23).

June
 1 – The 4th Montreal International Jazz Festival started in Montreal, Quebec, Canada (July  1 – 10).

July
 8
 The 8th North Sea Jazz Festival started in The Hague, Netherlands (July 8 – 10).
 The 17th Montreux Jazz Festival started in Montreux, Switzerland (July 8 – 24).

September
 16 – The 26th Monterey Jazz Festival started in Monterey, California (September 16 – 18).

Unknown date
 Eliane Elias married Randy Brecker, brother of Michael Brecker.

Album releases

Borbetomagus: Barbed Wire Maggots
Anthony Davis: Hemispheres
Terje Rypdal: Eos
Don Pullen: Evidence of Things Unseen
James Newton: Luella
Marilyn Crispell: Rhythms Hung in Undrawn Sky
Ganelin Trio: Semplice
Microscopic Septet: Take the Z Train
Muhal Richard Abrams: Rejoicing with Light
Tim Berne: Mutant Variations
Terence Blanchard & Donald Harrison: New York Second Line
Steps Ahead: Steps Ahead
Dollar Brand: Ekaya
Jamaaladeen Tacuma: Show Stopper
Pat Metheny: Rejoicing
Paul Motian: The Story of Maryam
Joachim Kuhn: I'm Not Dreaming
Kenny Wheeler: Double, Double You
Lakshminarayana Subramaniam: Spanish Wave
Roger Neumann: Introducing Rather Large Band
Dave Holland: Jumpin' In
Henry Threadgill: Just the Facts and Pass the Bucket
George Russell: So What
Derek Bailey: Epiphany
Bobby Shew: Breakfast Wine
Bob Wasserman: Solo
Joe McPhee: Visitation
Bobby Watson: Jewel
Branford Marsalis: Scenes In The City
Wynton Marsalis: Think of One
Ronald Shannon Jackson: Barbeque Dog
Shadowfax: Shadowdance
Michael Franks: Passionfruit
John Pizzarelli: I'm Hip (Please Don't Tell My Father)

Deaths

 January
 13
 Barry Galbraith, American guitarist (born 1919).
 John Ouwerx, Belgian pianist and composer (born 1903).
 28 – Sweet Emma Barrett, American pianist and singer (born 1897).

 February
 2 – Moses Allen, American upright bassist (born 1907).
 12 – Eubie Blake, American composer, lyricist, and pianist (born 1887).

 March
 14 – Gigi Gryce, American saxophonist, flautist, clarinetist, and composer (born 1925).
 16 – Ernie Royal, American trumpeter (born 1921).

 April
 1 – Ken Kersey, Canadian pianist (born 1916).
 7 – Cag Cagnolatti, American trumpeter (born 1911).
 13 – Dolo Coker, American pianist and composer (born 1927).
 22 – Earl Hines, American pianist and bandleader (born 1903).
 27 – Kippie Moeketsi, South-African alto saxophonist (born 1925).

 May
 6 – Kai Winding, Danish-American trombonist and composer (born 1922).
 25 – Paul Quinichette, American tenor saxophonist (born 1916).

 June
 19 – Al Lucas, Canadian upright bassist (born 1912).

 July
 1 – Sandy Mosse, American tenor saxophonist (born 1929).
 5 – Harry James, American trumpeter and band leader (born 1916).
 8 – Lammar Wright Jr., American trumpeter (born 1924).
 12 – Chris Wood, English saxophonist and flautist, Traffic (born 1944).
 15 – Sadik Hakim, American pianist and composer (born 1919).
 18 – Bob Cornford, British jazz pianist and composer (born 1940).

 August
 9 – Don Ewell, American stride pianist (born 1916).

 September
 1 – Arthur Herzog Jr., American songwriter and composer (born 1900).
 15
 Willie Bobo, Puerto Rican-American percussionist (born 1934).
 Johnny Hartman, African-American singer (born 1923).
 18 – Roy Milton, American singer, drummer, and bandleader (born 1907).

 October
 Wilbert Baranco, American pianist and bandleader (born 1909).

 November
 8 – James Booker, American keyboarder (born 1939).
 12 – Preston Jackson, American trombonist (born 1902).
 22 – Kamil Běhounek, Bohemian-Czech accordionist (born 1916).
 25 – Waymon Reed, American trumpeter (born 1940).

 December
 13 – Marshall Brown, American trombonist and multi-instrumentalist (born 1920).
 16 – Harry Miller, South African upright bassist (born 1941).

 Unknown date
 Pat Smythe, Scottish pianist (born 1923).

Births

 January
 20 – Eivind Lønning, Norwegian trumpeter.

 February
 22 – Lars Winther, Danish pianist, composer, producer, and arranger.

 March
 10 – Lőrinc Barabás, Hungarian trumpeter and composer.
 31 – Christian Scott aTunde Adjuah, American trumpeter.

 April
 20 – Ryan Blotnick, American guitarist.

 May
 8 – Nikoletta Szőke, Hungarian singer.
 26 – Rune Nergaard, Norwegian upright bassist, Bushman's Revenge.

 June
 17 – Jaimie Branch, American trumpeter and electronica artist.
 24 – Gard Nilssen, Norwegian drummer, Puma.
 30 – Espen Berg, Norwegian pianist, arranger, and composer, Trondheim Jazz Orchestra.

 July
 5 – Sofia Jernberg, Ethiopian-Swedish experimental singer and composer.
 8 – Jamie Brooks, English pianist, keyboarder, composer, and arranger.
 13 – Harold Lopez Nussa, Cuban jazz pianist.
 22 – Andreas Ulvo, Norwegian pianist, organist, keyboarder, and composer, Eple Trio.

 September
 14 – Amy Winehouse, English singer and songwriter (died 2011).
 19 – Petter Eldh, Swedish upright bassist and composer.
 25 – Hayden Powell, English trumpeter and composer.
 26 – Magnus Hjorth, Swedish pianist and composer.

 October
 14 – Andreas Stensland Løwe, Norwegian pianist, Splashgirl.

 November
 10
 Bez Idakula, Nigerian multi-instrumentalist, singer-songwriter, and composer.
 David Virelles, Cuban pianist and composer.
 Svein Magnus Furu, Norwegian saxophonist composer, and music journalist.

 Unknown date
 Emanuele Maniscalco, Italian pianist, drummer, and composer.
 Guro Skumsnes Moe, Norwegian upright bassist and singer.
 Lauren Kinsella, Irish singer and composer.
 Tom Hasslan, Norwegian guitarist.

See also

 1980s in jazz
 List of years in jazz
 1983 in music

References

External links 
 History Of Jazz Timeline: 1983 at All About Jazz

Jazz
Jazz by year